Nicobium castaneum is a species of death-watch beetle in the family Ptinidae. It is found in Africa, Europe and Northern Asia (excluding China), North America, and Southern Asia.

References

Further reading

 
 

Anobiinae
Articles created by Qbugbot
Beetles described in 1790